Singida Airstrip  is an airstrip in central Tanzania serving the municipality of Singida.

See also

 List of airports in Tanzania
 Transport in Tanzania

References

External links
Kikwete pledges improvements to Singida Airstrip
OpenStreetMap - Singida
OurAirports - Singida

Airstrips in Tanzania
Buildings and structures in the Singida Region